Chianghsia is an extinct genus of monstersaurian platynotan lizard  known from the Late Cretaceous deposits of the Nanxiong Formation, southern China. It contains a single species, Chianghsia nankangensis. Its genus is named after Jiangxi and its specific name is after Nankang District, Ganzhou.

References

Late Cretaceous lepidosaurs of Asia
Cretaceous lizards
Fossil taxa described in 2012
Prehistoric reptile genera
Taxa named by Susan E. Evans
Taxa named by Xu Xing